Phillip Avalon is an Australian writer, producer, director and actor of films and TV.

Film writer Scott Murray wrote in 1993 that:
If Australia has any producer-cum-auteurs, then Phillip Avalon is certainly one... Avalon's films are preoccupied with violence bubbling to the surface in a lower-middle-class society repressed by Christian and materialist values. He has a decided affinity for the topsider, for those who refuse to play society's games, and whose anti-social attitudes may, in fact, conceal a soul well attuned to life's pulses.

Biography
Avalon grew up in Newcastle. He spent several years serving in the Australian army, including a stint in New Guinea.

Avalon first came to public attention as a model, then he moved into acting. He studied acting at the Independent Theatre in North Sydney, and began getting roles in stage productions such as Hadrian VII with Barry Morse and on Australian TV dramas.

In 1974 Avalon spent some time in Los Angeles seeking work as an actor.
That same year he posed for ‘Playgirl’ magazine, and was the November ‘Man of the Month.’

Producer
Avalon moved into producing with Double Deal, a movie he made for television which he wrote and produced, as well as starring in. The film was never released due to Avalon running out of funds, but he regarded it as his "personal film school." He then made a surf movie Windrider.

He produced and starred in Summer City (1977), a drama set around a surfing town which became a hit, and was Mel Gibson's first movie. He was later called in to help make the film Little Boy Lost (1978). He had such an unhappy time on the film he left the film industry for a number of years, focusing on other interests, notably a surf shop.

Avalon returned to filmmaking with Breaking Loose a sequel to Summer City.

Select filmography
That Lady from Peking (1969) - actor
Squeeze a Flower (1970) - actor
Number 96 (1974) (film) - cameo
Inn of the Damned (1974) - actor
The Resurrection (1974) (TV special) - actor
The Third Eye - actor
Double Dealer (1975) (TV movie)
Waverider (1975)
Summer City (1977) - producer, actor
Little Boy Lost (1978) - producer
Breaking Loose (1988) - producer
Sher Mountain Killings Mystery (1990) - producer
Exchange Lifeguards (1992)
Fatal Bond (1993)
Signal One (1994)
Tunnel Vision (1995)
The Finder (2001)
The Pact (2003)
Liquid Bridge (2003)
William Kelly's War (2014)

Theatre Credits
Hadrian VII - actor
The Backstreet General - actor, writer
Odyssey - Maker of Dreams
Treasure Island - Old Tote Theatre - with Tony Barber

References

Notes

External links

Phil Avalon at BFI

Australian film producers
Australian film directors
Australian screenwriters
Australian male film actors
Living people
Year of birth missing (living people)